Vladimir Alekseevich Grebennikov (August 22, 1932 – December 12, 1992) was an ice hockey player who played for the Soviet national team. He won a bronze medal at the 1960 Winter Olympics  as an Ice Hockey Men. In 1950-53 he played with Spartak Moskva, then in 1953-54 played with Dvorets Kultury imeny Karl Marksa Elektrostal, and in 1954-64 was with Krylya Sovetov Moskva. Vladimir Grebennikov ended his career with Spartak Ryazan in 1964-66.

Career highlights

References 

1932 births
1992 deaths
Sportspeople from Penza
Ice hockey players at the 1960 Winter Olympics
Olympic bronze medalists for the Soviet Union
Olympic ice hockey players of the Soviet Union
Olympic medalists in ice hockey
Medalists at the 1960 Winter Olympics
Russian ice hockey players
HC Spartak Moscow players
Krylya Sovetov Moscow players